Artur Hennadiyovych Ornat (born 9 September 1999) is a Ukrainian professional footballer who plays as a central midfielder for Bukovyna Chernivtsi.

References

External links
 
 

1999 births
Living people
People from Dzhankoy
Ukrainian footballers
Association football midfielders
FC Barsa Sumy players
FC Karpaty Halych players
FC Bukovyna Chernivtsi players
Ukrainian Second League players
Ukrainian expatriate footballers
Expatriate footballers in Poland
Ukrainian expatriate sportspeople in Poland